Grass Lake is a natural lake in South Dakota, in the United States.

Grass Lake received its name from the abundance of marsh grass within it.

See also
List of lakes in South Dakota

References

Lakes of South Dakota
Lakes of Minnehaha County, South Dakota